The Climax CR1 is a British mid-engine, rear-wheel drive two-seater sports car by Climax Cars Ltd.

Concept Climax 
The Climax CR1 was introduced as the Concept Climax which debuted at the 2007 Goodwood Festival of Speed. Designed by three Coventry University graduates. Inspired by the 1950s Cooper Climax F1 design, powered by an ethanol flat four engine.

Gallery

Production Model 
The production model debuted at the 2015 Coventry Motofest. The bodywork is made of a combination of aluminium and carbon fibre. It includes flip up aeroscreen, detachable steering wheel and removable tonneau cover.

Options includes air conditioning and sound system.

The CR1 has an estimated top speed of 274 km/h (170 mph) and accelerate from 0-60 mph (97 km/h) in 4 seconds.

The fuel efficiency rated at 20.5 mpg (Urban), 34.4 mpg (Extra Urban) and 27.4 mpg (Combined) and emits 243 g/km .

References

2000s cars
Cars of England
Rear mid-engine, rear-wheel-drive vehicles
Sports cars
Cars powered by boxer engines